Louis Islary is an Indian politician. He was elected to the Lok Sabha, lower house of the Parliament of India from the Kokrajhar of Assam as an Independent.

References

External links
Biographical Sketch Member of Parliament 

1948 births
Living people
India MPs 1996–1997
Lok Sabha members from Assam
People from Kokrajhar district